This is a list of video game franchises by Sega or a subsidiary of the company. All series spanning multiple games are listed here. Games that were developed and published by third parties but released on Sega consoles are not listed here.

Among the franchises listed here are franchises now owned by 2K Sports, as those franchises were originally published by Sega until Sega sold the rights to the franchises in 2005. In the case of these games, the latest release date given for the franchise shall be that of the last game in which Sega was involved in its publishing.

Also included in the franchise list is Total War. While this series did not begin with Sega as either a developer or a publisher, Sega did publish later games in the series. The same applies to franchises owned by Atlus which Sega acquired in 2013 or the intellectual properties of Technosoft acquired in 2016.

Franchises

Licensed franchises

See also 
 Lists of Sega games
List of Sega video games
List of Sega arcade games
List Sega mobile games

References 

Lists of video game franchises
Video game lists by company
 
 Franchises